State Route 145 is a state highway in the U.S. state of California, running through the heart of the San Joaquin Valley from Interstate 5 near Coalinga north to Route 41 north of Fresno.

Route description
SR 145 travels through the center of the San Joaquin Valley, remaining a rural two-lane road in its entirety. The southern terminus of SR 145 is at I-5 near Coalinga. SR 145 heads northeast as Fresno-Coalinga Road, turning north at the junction with SR 269 in Five Points, where it assumes the designation as Lassen Avenue. After passing through the town of Helm, SR 145 heads northeast as McMullin Grade, before turning north again as South Madera Avenue. SR 145 intersects with SR 180 in the city of Kerman, where it continues north to cross into Madera County. After passing through Ripperdan, SR 145 intersects SR 99 in Madera. From Madera, the route turns east, and ends at SR 41.

Various crops such as cotton, table grapes, tomatoes and melons are grown along the route in one of the most productive agricultural areas in the world.

SR 145 is part of the California Freeway and Expressway System, and near SR 99 is part of the National Highway System, a network of highways that are considered essential to the country's economy, defense, and mobility by the Federal Highway Administration.

Major intersections

See also

References

External links

California @ WestCostRoads.com - State Route 145
Caltrans: Route 145 highway conditions
California Highways: Route 145

145
State Route 145
State Route 145
Madera, California